HMS Hercules was a 74-gun third-rate ship of the line of the Royal Navy, designed by Sir Thomas Slade and built at Deptford Dockyard by Adrian Hayes and launched on 15 March 1759.

Service History

On 20 November 1759 she took part in the huge conflict between the British and French fleets at the Battle of Quiberon Bay.

The ship took part as part of Admiral Rodney's fleet in the Battle of the Saintes under the command of Captain Henry Savage on 12 April 1782 against a French fleet, where she suffered six killed and 18 wounded. Savage commanded from an armchair on the main deck due to his suffering from gout. Savage was injured in the chair, but following treatment below deck reappeared in the chair in bandages.

She was paid off in July 1783 and sold at Plymouth in March 1784 for £1300.

Officers of note
Charles Brisbane midshipman on Hercules 1781/2
Thomas Hurd was an officer on Hercules in 1782.

Notes

References

 Lavery, Brian (2003) The Ship of the Line - Volume 1: The development of the battlefleet 1650-1850. Conway Maritime Press. .
 Willis, Sam (2007) Fighting Ships 1750-1850 Quercus. .

External links
 

Ships of the line of the Royal Navy
Hercules-class ships of the line
1759 ships
Ships built in Deptford